Richard Barlow may refer to:

 Richard Barlow (intelligence analyst), American intelligence analyst
 Richard Barlow (cricketer) (born 1972), English cricketer
 Richard Eugene Barlow (born 1931), American mathematician and professor

See also 
 Dick Barlow (1851–1919), English cricketer